The president of Chile, officially known as the President of the Republic of Chile, is the head of state and head of government of the Republic of Chile. The President is responsible for both government administration and state administration. Although its role and significance have changed over time, and its position and relations with other actors in the national political organization have also evolved, it remains one of the most prominent political offices in the country. It is also considered one of the key institutions that form the "Historic Constitution of Chile," and is crucial to the country's political stability.

Under the current Constitution, adopted in 1980, the President serves a four-year term and is not eligible for immediate re-election. The shorter term (previously it was six years) allows for synchronized parliamentary and presidential elections. The President's official seat is the La Moneda Palace in the capital Santiago.

Michelle Bachelet was the first female President of Chile and served from 2006 to 2010 and from 2014 to 2018. Since 2022, Gabriel Boric is the current President, having won the 2021 Chilean general election and taking office on 11 March 2022.

Features of the office

Requirements
The Constitution of 1980, with its 2005 amendment, outlines the qualifications for becoming President. To be eligible, the individual must be a natural-born Chilean citizen or born abroad to Chilean parents or grandparents. They must also be at least 35 years old and meet all the requirements for becoming a Senator.

In addition, the president must have the right to vote as a fully Chilean citizen, which includes being at least 18 years of age, not having been sentenced to a severe punishment, not having lost the right to vote due to insanity, not having been tried or condemned for a serious crime or terrorist conduct, nor condemned by the Constitutional Court under Article 8 of the Chilean Constitution.

Election
Article 26 detail the electoral requirements. The president shall be elected by direct ballot, with an absolute majority of the votes validly cast. A two-round system is used. In order to win the election in the first round, the winning candidate's party must receive more than 50 percent of the valid votes leaving out of the count blank and spoiled votes.

The election shall be held the third Sunday of November of the year immediately before the end of the administration of the president then holding office. Should there be more than two candidates in the presidential election, none of them obtaining more than half of the votes validly cast, a new election shall be held. The second election ("balloting"), in the manner determined by law, shall be held the fourth Sunday after the first election, limited to the two candidates with the highest relative majorities. Then, the candidate with the majority of valid votes in that round is elected president.

Term duration

Under the 1828 constitution, the president served for four years, without the possibility of immediate reelection for one more term. In 1833, the presidential period was changed to five years, with a possibility of immediate reelection for one more term, limited to two consecutive terms. Then by a constitutional reform in 1878, possibility for reelection became disallowed. Under the 1925 constitution, the president served for a six-year term, without the possibility of immediate reelection.
 
In the original text of the 1980 constitution,  the president served for an eight-year term without the possibility of immediate reelection. Some transitory disposals, fixed during the military dictatorship of the general Augusto Pinochet, allowed the exceptional possibility of his reelection in the 1988 plebiscite. Then, in the transition to democracy the 1989 referendum established a first transitional four-year presidential term (1990–1994), followed by common eight-year terms, without the possibility of immediate reelection. However, in 4 March 1994 (a week before Eduardo Frei Ruiz-Tagle took office) the presidential period was reduced to a six-year term, without an immediate reelection. 

Under the 2005 constitutional reform, the president serves for four years without the possibility of immediate reelection for one more term. A former president may run for office once again after serving their initial term, but only in an election following their successor, as it is not allowed to run for consecutive terms. There is no limit to how many times a person can run for candidacy if they have not previously served as president.

The incumbent president, in accordance with the constitution, completes their corresponding term on 11 March of the immediate year after the election. The president-elect takes office the same day.

Succession
In the case when the president is unable to perform their duties, their powers are usually temporarily transferred to the Minister of the Interior under the title of "vice president"; however this is not a true vice presidential position, but rather a position of a designated acting president. If the president and minister of the interior are both temporarily unavailable, the next minister of the government, in the order of succession, becomes the "vice president".

Presidential symbols

Presidential sash 

The presidential sash, used initially by Bernardo O'Higgins, became a symbol of the authority of the first president with the assumption of office by President José Joaquín Prieto in 1831.

From the nineteenth century a single sash was maintained that was transferred from president to president until 1915, due to the height differences between the outgoing Ramón Barros Luco and the elected Juan Luis Sanfuentes, so a new sash had to be designed. Since that date, each president has had his or her own presidential sash, which is used only in official ceremonies.

O'Higgins Pioche 

It dates back to the medals of the Legion of Merit and remained intact until the coup d'état of 1973, when it disappeared during the bombing of the La Moneda palace. During the military regime of Augusto Pinochet a replica of the pioche was created, based on photographs of the original. It is only used together with the presidential sash.

Ford Galaxie 500 

The president of Chile traditionally used an elegant horse drawn "Bandeja" Carriage imported from France by President José Manuel Balmaceda for ceremonial events until president Salvador Allende, not wanting to project the image of royalty that carriages now confer, used the black 1966 Ford Galaxie XL convertible acquired in 1968 for Queen Elizabeth II's visit to Chile as his official vehicle with a normally issued license plate (EL-2801).  
 
Both the carriage and the Galaxie have since been maintained by the state and are now used only for official ceremonies, such as state visits and the national holidays on 21 May and 19 September, and presidential inaugurations which take place on 11 March every four years.

See also
 Vice President of Chile
 Presidents of Chile timeline
 2021 Chilean presidential election

References

External links
Presidencia 

 
Government of Chile
Chile
1826 establishments in Chile